The Roman Catholic Diocese of Ponce is an ecclesiastical territory or diocese of the Roman Catholic Church in the United States and consists of the southern part of the island of Puerto Rico, a territory of the United States.  The diocese is led by a prelate bishop who pastors the mother church in the City of Ponce, the Cathedral of Our Lady of Guadalupe. Its current bishop is S.E.R. Mons. Rubén Antonio González Medina, C.M.F. Its jurisdiction includes the municipalities of Adjuntas, Jayuya, Guánica, Guayanilla, Yauco,  Peñuelas, Ponce, Juana Díaz, Villalba, Coamo, Santa Isabel, Salinas, Guayama, Arroyo, and Patillas.

History
In 1978, Bishop Fremiot Torres Oliver acquired a large property in the Rio Chiquito sector of Barrio Portugués where the Diocese is currently (2019) located.

Spanish colonial system
Under the Spanish colonial system (1692–1898) the Diocese of Ponce operated and its bishop in 1877 was Juan Puig. From 25 October 1892 to 1897, the bishop was Lorenzo Roura y Bayer.

Other Padres Paules bishops at the Cathedral were:
 Lorenzo Roura y Bayer (25 October 1892 – 1897)
 Leonardo G. Villanueva (1897–1898)
 Sturnino Janices (1997–1898)
 Francisco Vicario (1898–1905)
 Luis Vega (1905–1911)
 Cipariano Peña (1911–1919)
 Florencio Garcia (1919–1927)
 Manuel Peña (1927–1931)
 Gonzalo de la Guerra (1931–1937)
 Deogracias Morondo (1937–1940)
 Toribio Marijuan (1940–1945)
 Mariano Bravo (1945–1948)
 Epifanio Garcia (1948–1957)
 Jose Carrasco (1957)

From 1970 on, Padres Paules left Ponce and the Cathedral was then run by the Diocese of Ponce directly.

American colonial system
The See of Ponce was canonically erected on 21 November 1924, and is a suffragan diocese of the Metropolitan Province of San Juan de Puerto Rico.

San Juan Archdiocese bankruptcy
On 7 September 2018, Judge Edward Godoy ruled that the bankruptcy filed by the Archdiocese of San Juan would also apply to every Catholic diocese in Puerto Rico, including Ponce, and that all would now have their assets protected under Chapter 11.

Bishops of Ponce
The list of the  bishops of Ponce and their terms of service. These are only the ecclesiastical bishops; emeritus bishops are not included here: 
 Edwin Byrne (1925–1929), appointed Bishop of San Juan de Puerto Rico
 Aloysius Joseph Willinger (1929–1946), appointed Coadjutor Bishop of Monterey-Fresno
 James Edward McManus (1947–1963), resigned
 Luis Aponte Martinez (1963–1964), appointed Archbishop of San Juan de Puerto Rico
 Juan Fremiot Torres Oliver (1964–2000), retired
 Ricardo Antonio Suriñach Carreras (2000–2003), retired
 Félix Lázaro Martínez (2003–2015), retired
 Ruben Antonio Gonzalez Medina, C.M.F. (2015–present)

Coadjutor Bishops
 Luis Aponte Martinez (1963–1963)
 Félix Lázaro Martinez (2002–2003)

Auxiliary Bishops
 Luis Aponte Martinez (1960–1963), appointed Coadjutor Bishop of Ponce
 Ricardo Antonio Suriñach Carreras (1975–2000), appointed Bishop of Ponce

Parish churches
Parish church by founding date
 1616	1	 	Iglesia San Blas de Illescas, Coamo
 1692	2	 	Catedral de Nuestra Señora de Guadalupe, Ponce
 1736	3	 	San Antonio de Padua, Guayama
 1756	4	 	Ntra. Sra. del Rosario, Yauco
 1793	5	 	San José, Peñuelas
 1798	6	 	Iglesia San Ramón Nonato, Juana Díaz
 1811	7	 	Inmaculado Corazón de María, Patillas
 1815	8	 	San Joaquín y Santa Ana, Adjuntas
 1840	9	 	Inmaculada Concepción, Guayanilla
 1854	10	 	Ntra. Sra. de Monserrate, Salinas
 1854	11	 	Santiago Apóstol, Santa Isabel
 1855	12	 	Ntra. Sra. del Carmen, Arroyo
 1883	13	 	Ntra. Sra. de Monserrate, Jayuya
 1883	14	 	Ntra. Sra. del Carmen, Playa (Ponce)
 1888	15	 	San Antonio Abad, Guánica
 1917	16	 	Ntra. Sra. del Carmen, Villalba
 1928	17	 	Ntra. Sra. de la Medalla Milagrosa, Ponce
 1928	18	 	Ntra. Sra. de la Merced, Ponce
 1930	19	 	Santa Teresita, Ponce
 1946	20	 	Sagrado Corazón, Aguirre
 1948	21	 	San Conrado, Ponce
 1952	22	 	Santa María Reina, Ponce
 1959	23	 	Sagrado Corazón de Jesús, Tallaboa (Peñuelas)
 1962	24	 	Ntra. Sra. de la Divina Providencia, Villalba
 1963	25	 	Sagrado Corazón, Ensenada (Guánica)
 1964	26	 	San Vicente de Paúl, Ponce
 1964	27	 	San Judas Tadeo, Ponce
 1964	28	 	Cristo Rey, Ponce
 1965	29	 	San José, Ponce
 1967	30	 	La Resurrección, Ponce
 1968	31	 	Buen Pastor, Ponce
 1969	32	 	San Martín de Porres, Yauco
 1969	33	 	Corazón de Jesús, Ponce
 1969	34	 	Ntra. Sra. de la Medalla Milagrosa, Castañer (Asjuntas)
 1971	35	 	Santísima Trinidad, Ponce
 1973	36	 	Ntra. Sra. del Carmen, Coto Laurel (Ponce)
 1979	37	 	San José Obrero, Ponce
 1984	38	 	Ntra. Sra. de Lourdes, Aguilita (Juana Díaz)
 1984	39	 	Santa Teresita, Arús (Juana Díaz)
 1986	40	 	Santísimo Sacramento, Ponce
 2001	41	 	Santo Domingo de Guzmán, Yauco
 2001	42	 	San Antonio de Padua, Coamo
 2005	43	 	Santos Apóstoles Pedro y Pablo, Guayama

See also

 Catholic Church by country
 Catholic Church in the United States
 Ecclesiastical Province of San Juan de Puerto Rico
 Global organisation of the Catholic Church
 List of Roman Catholic archdioceses (by country and continent)
 List of Roman Catholic dioceses (alphabetical) (including archdioceses)
 List of Roman Catholic dioceses (structured view) (including archdioceses)
 List of the Catholic dioceses of the United States
 Roman Catholic Marian churches

References

External links
 Diócesis de Ponce (Official Site in Spanish)
 Official Facebook page (in Spanish)
 Roman Catholic Diocese of Ponce GCatholic.org website
 Católica Radio 88.9 FM & 89.1 FM - Diocese of Ponce FM Radio Station (Official Site in Spanish)

Ponce
Organizations based in Ponce, Puerto Rico
Christian organizations established in 1924
Ponce
Ponce
1924 establishments in Puerto Rico